Nephrolepis biserrata (giant swordfern, 长叶肾蕨) is a tropical fern, endemic to Florida, Mexico, the West Indies, Central America, South America, Africa, and southeast Asia. 

Its stipes are grayish brown and 10–50 cm × about 4 mm in size, with brownish-green, papery lamina that are 14–30 cm wide × 0.7–2 m in length, but has occasionally attained a length of  twenty-seven feet (eight meters). This is the largest of all the sword ferns and it often is labeled, Macho Fern, at nurseries. after its aggressive growth nature when compared to ferns such as the Boston Sword Fern, Nephrolepis exaltata that is planted more commonly.

Synonyms
 Aspidium acuminatum Willd.
 Aspidium acutum Schkuhr
 Aspidium biserratum Sw.
 Aspidium ensifolium Schkuhr
 Aspidium guineense Schumach.
 Aspidium punctulatum Sw.
 Hypopeltis biserrata (Sw.) Bory
 Lepidoneuron biserratum (Sw.) Fée
 Lepidoneuron punctulatum (Poir.) Fée
 Lepidoneuron rufescens (Schrad.) Fée
 Nephrodium acuminatum (Willd.) C. Presl
 Nephrodium acutum (Schkuhr) C. Presl
 Nephrodium biserratum (Sw.) C. Presl
 Nephrodium punctulatum (Sw.) Desv.
 Nephrodium rufescens Schrad.
 Nephrolepis acuminata (Willd.) C. Presl
 Nephrolepis acuta (Schkuhr) C. Presl
 Nephrolepis biserrata var. biserrata
 Nephrolepis biserrata subsp. punctulata (Poir.) Bonap.
 Nephrolepis ensifolia (Schkuhr) C. Presl
 Nephrolepis exaltata var. biserrata (Sw.) Baker
 Nephrolepis hirsutula var. acuta (Schkuhr) Kuntze
 Nephrolepis hirsutula var. biserrata (Sw.) Kuntze
 Nephrolepis mollis Rosenst.
 Nephrolepis punctulata (Poir.) C. Presl
 Nephrolepis rufescens (Schrad.) C. Presl ex Wawra
 Polypodium neprolepioides Christ
 Polypodium punctulatum Poir.
 Tectaria fraxinea Cav.

References
 Gen. Fil. pl. 3 1834.
 The Plant List
 eFloras entry
 Calero, K., Pitzer, T., & Alberte, J. (2012). General Biology II Lab Manual (2nd ed.). McGraw Hill.

biserrata
Ferns of Asia
Ferns of Africa
Ferns of Oceania
Ferns of the Americas
Flora of Central America
Flora of the Caribbean
Flora of South America
Flora of tropical Asia
Ferns of Brazil
Ferns of Mexico
Ferns of the United States